"You, Babe" is a song recorded by American country music artist Lefty Frizzell.  It was released in August 1972 as a single only.  The song reached #59 on the Billboard Hot Country Singles & Tracks chart.  The song was written by Sanger D. Shafer.

Cover versions
The song recorded in 1988 by American country music Merle Haggard backed by The Strangers under the title "You Babe".  Haggard's was released in November of that year as the fourth single from the album Chill Factor.  The song reached #23 on the Billboard Hot Country Singles & Tracks chart.

Chart performance

Lefty Frizzell

Merle Haggard

References

1972 songs
1972 singles
1988 singles
Lefty Frizzell songs
Merle Haggard songs
Songs written by Sanger D. Shafer
Columbia Records singles
Epic Records singles